Akali Joginder Singh , better known as Baba Joginder Singh is a Nihang Singh and the 15th Jathedar of Budha Dal, after Akali Surjit Singh. He was born in Boparai Kalan, Ludhiana.

Personal life
Baba Ji was born in the Boparai Kalan village of the Ludhiana district. This region of western Ludhiana has been heavily influenced by Sikhi since the times of the travels of 6ve Patshah Guru Hargobind Sahib Ji Maharaj and 10ve Patshah Guru Gobind Singh Sahib Ji Maharaj.

Nihang Dals, Damdami Taksal, and the Nanaksar Kaleran sect along with other groups have had a great impact in this area. The village of Raqba for instant had been visited by Guru Hargobind Sahib and the specific spot where they had rested had a Gurdwara build on top it. This Gurdwara since has been run  Budha Dal to maintain the history.

Due to the rich history and the close proximity of the village and Gurdwara, Baba Ji would often stay at the gurdwara and do seva for hours while also learning Bani through santhya by the Singhs doing maintenance. This would lead to the enrolling of Baba Ji into the Budha Dal and the ceremony of Amrit Sanchar. 

For most of their life, Baba Ji has been at Gurdwara Damdama Sahib (Raqba) handling the maintenance and doing seva for the sangat rather than being fully Chakarvarti. They do travel from village to village doing parchar and to other Indian states. In their life, they have travelled to the UK occasionally for parchar.

Jathedari
When Akali Surjit Singh was imprisoned alongside 22 other Singhs of the Dal in 2009, Baba Ji was put in control as an acting Jathedar of the Budha Dal to handle the Dal while Baba Surjit Singh was in jail. 

In the September of 2014 when Akali Surjit Singh passed away at the age of 69, Baba Ji was one of the many prominent names of whom might be chosen as the successor. Baba Surjit Singh had chosen for Baba Ji to be the next Jathedar after their death. However, Baba Ji was doing an England tour during the situation, so a faction of the Dal reluctantly chose Baba Prem Singh as the next Jathedar.

By this decision made by a certain faction of the Dal, it had been clarified that the Dal had been split into two. Baba Ji still respects the other faction and visits them as an attempt to keep the Dal in peace. Most Nihangs of the Malwa region including the Buddha Dal (UK) accept Baba Ji as the successor of Baba Surjit Singh. A lot of this has contributed to the division in Budha Dal today.

References

Nihang